Willemsen may refer to:

August Willemsen (1936–2007), Dutch translator of Portuguese and Brazilian literature
Daniël Willemsen (born 1975), Dutch sidecarcross rider and nine times World Champion
Elfje Willemsen (born 1985), Belgian bobsledder who has competed since 2007
Madeline Willemsen (1915–1982), Puerto Rican actress and comedian
Marcel Willemsen (born 1977), Dutch sidecarcross passenger and 1999 World Champion
Mike Willemsen (born 1996), Dutch DJ, record producer, musician
Roger Willemsen (1955-2016), German author, essayist and TV presenter

See also
Willems
Willemse
Wilhelmsen
Willemsens
Williamson (disambiguation)

Dutch-language surnames
Patronymic surnames
Surnames from given names